Bartosz Bida (born 21 February 2001) is a Polish professional footballer who plays as a forward for Jagiellonia Białystok.

References

External links
Profile at 90minut.pl

2001 births
Living people
Polish footballers
Association football forwards
Poland youth international footballers
Poland under-21 international footballers
Stal Rzeszów players
Jagiellonia Białystok players
Wigry Suwałki players
I liga players
III liga players
People from Rzeszów